Bendik Brænne (born 17 August 1987) is a Norwegian producer, artist, and songwriter.

Growing up, Brænne started writing songs in the basement of his childhood home with older brother Mattis Brænne Wigestrand. Both of them, who at the time played in different ska/punk bands, started writing songs together for their respective bands. This evolved into an ongoing collaboration.

As a backing musician Brænne has performed with several well-known music groups, and appears on albums by Kurt Nilsen, Amund Maarud, Dumdum Boys, Jonas Alaska and many more.

Together with his father Trond Brænne and sister Kaia Brænne he was nominated for the 2010 Brage Prize in the category children's literature.

His debut album, How To Fake It In America, was released in March 2013. The album won the Spellemannsprisen (Norwegian Grammys) for best country album in 2013. Later that year Brænne released "Aloha from Torshov", an EP containing four songs.

In October 2014 he released his second album, titled Do you know who I think I am. The album got a Spellemansprisen nomination.

September 1, 2017 Brænne released his third solo record, The last great country swindle. The album featured Canadian artist Daniel Romano, and members of Los Plantronics. The album won Spellemannsprisenfor best country album. A year after, almost to the date, Brænne released Benedictionary. An album written, produced, recorded, played and designed by Brænne himself.

Brænne is also a member of The Needs, a pop-punk group with members from bands such as Kvelertak, Oslo Ess and Honningbarna.

Discography 
Solo Discography 
2018: Benedictionary (Bendix)
2017: The last great country swindle (Bendix)
2014: Do you know who I think I am (Snaxville)
2013: Aloha from Torshov EP (Snaxville)
2013: How to Fake It in America (Snaxville)

With The Needs
2019: You Need the Needs (Jansen)

With Los Plantronics

2017: The worst is yet to come (Jansen)
2015: Surfing Times (Jansen)
2011: Organic Voodoo Soup (Jansen)

With Amund Maarud

2015: Volt (Snaxville)
2012: Dirt (Snaxville)
2011: Electric (Snaxville)

With No Torso

2008: Ready Already
2006: Several Brains
2004: Fatal Fraud

Other projects
2020: Six string holiday, with Perry Dear and the Deerstalkers 
2020: Travels, with Endre Nordvik
2020: The Backbouncebillity of humans, with Harald Thune
2020: I morra kjører jeg forbi, with Kristian Kaupang
2020: Rock Omelette, with Mats Wawa
2020: Eksil på Sundrehall, with Hellbillies
2020: After the bees, with Øyvind Holm
2020: Don’t Remember - Can’t Forget, with Alxsander Pettersen
2019: Love, with Torgeir Waldemar
2019: Young Heart, with Unnveig Aas
2019: MamaLove, with Queendome
2019: Norwegicana, with Jack Stillwater
2018: Good times ar bad times for somebody, with Numa Edema
2018: The Letter, with Alexander Pettersen
2018: Unknown skyline, with Mighty Magnolias
2018: Drømmen drømmerne drømmer, with Hubbabubbaklubb
2018: Kløyvd, with Odd Nordstoga
2018: References pt.2, with Malin Pettersen
2018: All city, with Label
2018: Heines sommerfavoritter Vol.2, with Heine Totland
2018: Gold, with Endre Nordvik
2018: Unbridled & Ablaze, with Zialand
2017: Oslo - Harlem , with BAYA
2017: World wide frequency, with Wild Man Riddim
2017: Mykje lyd , with Odd Nordstoga
2017: A Keen Eye for the Obvious, with Thulsa Doom
2017: Don't Mess with My Rock'n Roll, with Backstreet Girls
2017: Fear Is a Deamon, with Jonas Alaska
2017: Pop Noir, with Øystein Greni
2017: Amazing, with Kurt Nilsen
2017: Life of A Rudeboy, with Fyah George
2016: Predikant, with Predikant
2016: Divided, with Tommy Kristiansen
2016: Hopp Karoline, with Krom
2016: Mosaics, with Hard Luck Street
2016: Medicine, with Simen Aanerud
2016: Superkrefter, with Dizzet ft. Admiral P
2015: The Better End, with Caddy
2015: Durg natt, with Anders Bjørnvold
2015: Wild Man Riddim, with Wild Man Riddim
2014: Jump, with Queendom
2014: Manjolia mountains, with Manjolia mountains
2014: Bli her til eg dør, with Iselin Andreasen
2014: Bless Us All - Songs of Mickey Newbury, with Paal Flaata
2014: Will ni åka mer, with Senjahopen
2014: Green Means Walk Red Means Run, with Shaun Bartlett
2014: Alt, with West Bank Robbers
2014: Frode Johansen, with Frode Johansen
2014: Kall det hva du vil, with Herreløse
2014: Porterville, with Porterville
2014: Bli her til eg dør, with Iselin Andresen
2014: ...The Further Out You Get, with The South
2013: Glimpse of What We Had, with The South
2013: Violent Hippies, with Popgun
2013: Della Loved Steve, with Grand Island
2013: If Only As a Ghost, with Jonas Alaska
2013: Inertia, with Gina Aspenes
2013: Selections, Images under constructions, with Dandylion
2013: Ikkje vekk mæ før æ våkna, with Julie Willumsen
2013: My Sun, with Mona & Maria
2012: Sing Like Me, with Stina Stenerud & Her Soul Replacement
2012: Dead Man's Shoes, with The Lucky Bullets
2012: Images Under Construction, with Dandylion
2012: Ti liv, with Dumdum Boys
2011: Prairie Sun, with Orbo & Longshots
2011: Melodi Grand Prix 2011, with Melodi Grand Prix
2011: Joy Visible, with Foyn Trio
2011: Jobber overtid, with Admiral P
2010: Go and Tell, with SUM
2010: Den unge Fleksnes, with Den unge Fleksnes
2010: Live 10, with Orbo & Longshots
2010: Live fr Operaen, dugnad for Haiti, with Forente artister
2010: Elevator Sessions, with Paul Tonning
2010: Dugnad for Haiti - Live fra Operaen, with various artists
2009: Public Treason, with Fence
2009: Hooga Island, with Hooga Troopers
2009: Masquerade, with Orbo & the Longshots
2009: Soul Deep, with Noora Noor
2009: Appelsinpiken, with various artists
2009: Abracadabra, with Bazooka Boppers
2008: Røde Hunder, with Trond Brænne
2008: Himmelblå, with "various artists"
2008: Absolute music 20, with various artists
2008: Worry No, with "Chris lee"
2008: Welcome to Annoying Town, with 
2008: Shrink the City to a Light, with Shaun Bartlett
2008: Put a Little Grease on my Axe, with Grand Cafe
2007: Troll, with Trond Brænne

Awards 
 2018 – Won the Spellemannprisen for The last great country swindle
 2015 – Nominated to Spellemannprisen for Do you know who I think I am
 2014 – Won the Spellemannprisen for How to fake it in America
 2014 – Nominated to the Bendiksen Award
 2013 – Nominated to Kulturdepartementets priser for barne- og ungdomslitteratur for the book series Dyra på gåren
 2010 – Nominated to the Brage Prize in "Billedbøker for barn og/eller voksne" for Uvenner

References

External links
Official website

1987 births
Living people
Musicians from Bærum
Norwegian saxophonists
21st-century saxophonists